The 1939 Sam Houston State Bearkats football team represented Sam Houston State Teachers College (now known as Sam Houston State University) as a member of the Lone Star Conference (LSC)  during the 1939 college football season. Led by second-year head coach Puny Wilson, the Bearkats compiled an overall record of 7–1–2 with a mark of 4–1–1 in conference play, and finished second in the LSC.

Schedule

References

Sam Houston State
Sam Houston Bearkats football seasons
Sam Houston State Bearkats football